New Hampshire held its election August 29, 1814.

See also 
 New Hampshire's at-large congressional district special election, 1814
 United States House of Representatives elections, 1814 and 1815
 List of United States representatives from New Hampshire

1814
New Hampshire
United States House of Representatives